The 1955–56 Montreal Canadiens season was the team's 47th season of play. The Canadiens placed first in the regular season standings (with their 45 wins setting an NHL record) and won the Stanley Cup for the eighth time in the club's history.

Offseason

Regular season

Final standings

Record vs. opponents

Schedule and results

Playoffs

Stanley Cup Finals

This was the first Finals for Henri Richard and Toe Blake's first Finals as coach. This year, they won in five games.

Detroit Red Wings vs. Montreal Canadiens

Montreal wins best-of-seven series 4 games to 1

Player statistics

Regular season
Scoring

Goaltending

Playoffs
Scoring

Goaltending

Awards and records
 Prince of Wales Trophy: Montreal Canadiens
 Art Ross Trophy: Jean Beliveau
 Hart Memorial Trophy: Jean Beliveau
 James Norris Memorial Trophy: Doug Harvey
 Vezina Trophy: Jacques Plante, Montreal Canadiens
 Jean Beliveau, Centre, NHL First Team All-Star
 Doug Harvey, Defenceman, NHL First Team All-Star
 Tom Johnson, Defenceman, NHL Second Team All-Star
 Bert Olmstead, Left Wing, NHL Second Team All-Star
 Jacques Plante, Goaltender, NHL First Team All-Star
 Maurice Richard, Right Wing, NHL First Team All-Star

Transactions

See also
 1955–56 NHL season

References

Canadiens on Hockey Database
Canadiens on NHL Reference

Mon
Mon
Montreal Canadiens seasons
Stanley Cup championship seasons